Antonio Zarzana Pérez (born 21 March 2002) is a Spanish professional footballer who plays for Numancia on loan from Sevilla. Mainly a winger, he can also appear as an attacking midfielder.

Club career
Born in Jerez de la Frontera, Cádiz, Andalusia, Zarzana joined Sevilla FC aged eight, after being spotted at a tournament in Portugal. On 27 May 2018, at the age of just 16 years and 2 months, he made his professional debut with the reserves by replacing José Lara in the 87th minute of a 2–1 home win against CD Numancia in the Segunda División championship.

Zarzana subsequently returned to the youth squads before being definitely promoted to the B-side by manager Paco Gallardo in 2020. He made his first team debut on 15 December of that year, replacing Oussama Idrissi late into a 3–0 away win over CD Ciudad de Lucena, for the season's Copa del Rey.

On 26 February 2021, Zarzana renewed his contract with the Nervionenses until 2024.

On 10 August 2022, Zarzana signed for Portuguese club Marítimo on loan. On 13 January 2023, he moved on a new loan to Numancia.

References

External links

2002 births
Footballers from Jerez de la Frontera
Living people
Spanish footballers
Spain youth international footballers
Association football wingers
Sevilla Atlético players
C.S. Marítimo players
CD Numancia players
Segunda División players
Primera Federación players
Segunda División B players
Primeira Liga players
Spanish expatriate footballers
Expatriate footballers in Portugal
Spanish expatriate sportspeople in Portugal